The 2018–19 UCI Track Cycling World Cup (also known as the Tissot UCI Track Cycling World Cup for sponsorship reasons) was a multi-race tournament over a track cycling season. It was the 27th series of the UCI Track Cycling World Cup organised by the UCI.

It will be the first edition of the World Cup to feature para-cycling.

Series 
On 12 February 2018 the UCI revealed the location and dates of the World Cup meetings for the season. Six rounds were scheduled in Saint-Quentin-en-Yvelines, France; Milton, Canada; Berlin, Germany; London, Great Britain; Cambridge, New Zealand and Hong Kong. It was the first time Saint-Quentin-en-Yvelines hosting a round of World Cup.

Montigny-le-Bretonneux, France
France's National Vélodrome de Saint-Quentin-en-Yvelines is near the city of Versailles, west of Paris. It hosted the opening round, on 19–21 October. The velodrome was completed in 2014 and hosted the 2015 UCI Track Cycling World Championships, where a number of world records were set. The velodrome also played host to the 2016 European Track Championships and will be the site of the track cycling events for the 2024 Olympic Games.  It can hold 6,000 spectators.

Milton, Canada 
The second round was hosted in Milton. The racing was held on three full days between 26 and 28 October 2018 at the Mattamy National Cycling Centre. The venue was built for the 2015 Pan and Parapan American Games held in Toronto. It is the only UCI Class 1 homologated indoor velodrome in Canada.

Berlin, Germany 
Round 3, to be held in Berlin from 30 November to 2 December. The velodrome was designed by internationally renowned French architect Dominique Perrault for Berlin's 2000 Olympic Games bid. It was built in 1997 on the site of the former Werner-Seelenbinder-Halle. Since opening, it has played host to the 2017 European Track Championships, the 1998 UCI Track Cycling World Cup Classics and the 1999 UCI Track Cycling World Championships. Since 1997, the traditional Six Days of Berlin has also taken place here. In preparation for the 2017 European Track Championships, the track was rebuilt.

London, United Kingdom 
Round 4 was held at the Lee Valley VeloPark, on 14–16 December.  Completed in 2011, the velodrome was the site of the 2012 Olympic Games and 2012 Paralympic Games track events. It has hosted the 2011-12 UCI Track Cycling World Cup and 2014-15 UCI Track Cycling World Cup, and the 2016 UCI Track Cycling World Championships. The 6750-capacity velodrome has also been used for the British Revolution track series and was the site of Sir Bradley Wiggins' successful Hour Record ride in 2015. For the first time in the history of the UCI World Cup, and in line with the UCI's integration objectives, para-cycling events will also be raced during the London stopover.

Cambridge, New Zealand 
The fifth round was hosted in Cambridge, which is a small town in the North Island of New Zealand. It is 24 kilometers away from the closest city Hamilton. This round was held between 18 and 20 January 2019. The Avantidrome was completed in 2014 and is the home of Cycling New Zealand's high-performance programme. The Avantidrome already hosted the 2015-16 UCI Track Cycling World Cup, as well as the Oceania Continental Track Championships and World Masters Games.

Hong Kong 
The last round of this World Cup series will be hosted in Hong Kong between 25 and 27 January 2019 at the Hong Kong Velodrome. Opened in 2013, the velodrome hosted the final round of the 2015-16 UCI Track Cycling World Cup, as well as the 2017 UCI Track Cycling World Championships, which is the first one in Asia in the 21st Century. It has permanent seating for 2,000 spectators, expandable to 3,000 for events such as the World Cup.

Format
The following events will be raced at all rounds:
 Individual sprint, men and women
 Team sprint, men and women
 Keirin, men and women
 Team pursuit, men and women
 Madison, men and women
 Omnium, men and women

Standings

Men 

Sprint

Team Sprint

Team Pursuit

Keirin

Omnium

Madison

1 km Time Trial

Scratch Race

Points Race

Women 

Sprint

Team Sprint

Team Pursuit

Keirin

Omnium

Madison

500m Time Trial

Scratch Race

Points Race

Overall Team Standings 
Overall team standings are calculated based on total number of points gained by the team's riders in each event.

Results

Men

Women

Medal table

References 

UCI Track Cycling World Cup
World Cup
World Cup
UCI Track Cycling World Cup
UCI Track Cycling World Cup
UCI Track Cycling World Cup
UCI Track Cycling World Cup
UCI Track Cycling World Cup
UCI Track Cycling World Cup
UCI Track Cycling World Cup, 2018